"That's What Tequila Does" is a song written by John Morgan, John Edwards, Tully Kennedy and Kurt Allison and recorded by American country music artist Jason Aldean. It was released on July 18, 2022 as the third single from Aldean's tenth studio album Macon, Georgia.

Content 
The song describes drinking away the sting of a lost love, albeit with tequila and demonstrating how it can lead to thinking in different and dangerous ways, remarking in part, "that's what tequila does."

Critical reception 
Jeffrey Kurtis of Today's Country Magazine wrote, "Though drinking away heartache is certainly nothing new to country music, by shifting the focus of the lyrics to show how it can torture you and trick you into thinking in different and dangerous ways, Aldean provides a fresh perspective to the old idea."

Chart performance 
The song debuted at number 47 on Country Airplay. It would later enter Hot Country Songs at number 41.

Charts

Weekly charts

Year-end charts

Release history

References 

2022 songs
2022 singles
Jason Aldean songs
BBR Music Group singles
Song recordings produced by Michael Knox (record producer)